The Tishan Bridge is a historic stone arch bridge over a stream in Yuecheng District of Shaoxing, Zhejiang, China.

Etymology
Tishan Bridge is named after the calligrapher Wang Xizhi of the Eastern Jin dynasty  (266–420) who wrote an inscription on an old woman's fan here.

History
The original bridge dates back to the Eastern Jin dynasty (266–420). The current structure was rebuilt in 1828, during the reign of Daoguang Emperor of the Qing dynasty (1644–1911).

On 6 May 2013, it was listed among the seventh batch of "Major National Historical and Cultural Sites in Zhejiang" by the State Council of China.

Gallery

References

Bridges in Zhejiang
Arch bridges in China
Bridges completed in 1828
Qing dynasty architecture
Buildings and structures completed in 1828
1828 establishments in China
Major National Historical and Cultural Sites in Zhejiang